The Bertone Blitz is an electric sports car produced in 1992 by the company Bertone, which worked under Ferrari.

External links
Photographs of Bertone Blitz:
http://www.carstyling.ru/resources/studio/92bertone_blitz_1.jpg
http://www.carstyling.ru/resources/studio/92bertone_blitz_2.jpg

Electric car models
Blitz